Schweyen (Lorraine Franconian: Schweije) is a commune in the Moselle department of the Grand Est administrative region in north-eastern France.

The village belongs to the Pays de Bitche and to the Northern Vosges Regional Nature Park. It is located on the German border between the towns of Bitche, France and Zweibrücken, Germany.

It was first mentioned in 1322 under the name of "Schweien", which comes from the Old German name "Schweiga", which meant "cow" or "cattle".

Today, this village is noted for its brass band, "Amicale des Sapeurs Pompiers et Batterie Fanfare de Schweyen".

See also
 Communes of the Moselle department

References

External links

 Brass Band website

Communes of Moselle (department)